Algeria is scheduled to compete at the 2022 Mediterranean Games in Oran, Algeria over 10 days from 25 June to 5 July 2022 with delegation of 522 persons (324 athletes in 24 sports), including 193 men and 136 women. The country finished the Games with 53 medals amongst all nations: 20 gold, 17 silver, and 16 bronze. This is the best participation in the history of Algeria, breaking the number of the 2001 Mediterranean Games. The sports with the most medals were Athletics, Karate and Boxing. The first medals Algeria earned were in Karate, where Algeria won six medals, including four golds by Cylia Ouikene, Louiza Abouriche and Chaima Midi for women's and Oussama Zaid for men's. In Boxing, Algeria participated with fifteen men's and women's boxers, 13 of whom won medals including five golds through Jugurtha Ait Bekka, Roumaysa Boualam, Hadjila Khelif, Imane Khelif and Yahia Abdelli. The third specialty in terms of medals is strong Athletics with a total of 13 medals, including five golds, by Bilal Tabti in 3000 m steeplechase, Yasser Triki in Triple jump, Bilel Afer in high jump, Djamel Sedjati in 800 m and finally the Men's 4×400 m relay team. In other sports participation was different and in Badminton duo Koceila Mammeri and Youcef Sabri Medel won a historic gold, and the only one in this specialty, by defeating the Spanish duo Luis Enrique Penalver Pereira and Pablo Abian Vicen. In fencing Algeria won its first gold medal in history with Saoussen Boudiaf winning against Italian Rebecca Gargano. In Judo, from which a lot was expected of Algeria, they earned four medals, one of which was gold by Messaoud Redouane Dris in 73 kg, defeating Moroccan Hassan Doukkali by Ippon. In wrestling, swimming and weightlifting, he won one gold medal in each discipline: Bachir Sid Azara in men's Greco-Roman as for Ishak Ghaiou and Abdelkrim Ouakali get the silver medal. Jaouad Syoud in 200 m individual medley and Walid Bidani in snatch +102 kg and was satisfied with silver in Clean & jerk.

Medal summary

Medal table

|  style="text-align:left; width:78%; vertical-align:top;"|

|  style="text-align:left; width:22%; vertical-align:top;"|

Archery 

Men

Women

Athletics (track and field) 

Track & road events
Men

Women

Field events
Men

Women

Badminton 

Algeria competed in badminton.

Men

Women

Basketball

Men's 3x3 tournament

Group A

Quarterfinals

5–8th place semifinals

Women's 3x3 tournament

Group A

Ninth place game

Boules 

Lyonnaise

Pétanque

Raffa

Boxing 

Algeria competed in boxing.

Men

Women
Algeria has entered six female boxers to compete instead of seven after the cancellation of the 75 kg category following the absence of several boxers.

Cycling

Equestrian

Fencing 

Men

Women

Football

Summary

Team roster
The following is the Algeria squad in the men's football tournament of the 2022 Mediterranean Games. The team of 20 players was officially named on 14 June.

Head coach:  Mourad Slatni

<noinclude>

Group play

Gymnastics

Artistic
Men
Team

Individual

Women
Team

Individual

Handball 

Summary

Men's tournament
Team roster
The following is the Algerian roster in the men's handball tournament of the  2022 Mediterranean Games.

Head coach: Rabah Gherbi

Group play

Fifth place game

Women's tournament
Group play

Seventh place game

Judo 

Algeria competed in judo.

Men

Women

Karate 

Men

Women

Sailing 

Algeria competed in sailing.

Men

Women

M = Medal race; EL = Eliminated – did not advance into the medal race

Shooting 

Algeria competed in shooting.

Men

Women

Swimming 

Men

Women

Volleyball

Men's tournament

Team roster
Head coach: Morad Sennoun

1 Ilyas Achouri 
2 Sofiane Bouyoucef 
3 Ahmed Amir Kerboua 
6 Mohamed Amine Oumessad 
7 Ali Kerboua WS
8 Boudjemaa Ikken 
9 Abderraouf Hamimes 
11 Soufiane Hosni WS
16 Islem Ould Cherchali 
17 Farouk Tizit WS
18 Billel Soualem WS
20 Youssouf Bourouba 

Group B

|}

|}

Women's tournament

Team roster
Head coach: Nabil Tennoun

1 Zina Mordjane Oudai 
3 Salima Hammouche 
5 Fahima Brahmi 
6 Wissem Djouhri 
7 Amira Bechar WS
8 Zohra Bensalem (C) WS
10 Melissa Soualmi 
11 Yasmine Abderrahim WS
12 Kahina Djouhri 
13 Radia Nadra Bellahsene 
14 Bekhta Rabah Mazari WS
15 Aicha Mezemate 

Group C

|}

|}

Table tennis

Taekwondo 

Men

Women

Tennis 

Men

Women

Weightlifting 

Men

Women

Wrestling 

Men's Freestyle

Women's Freestyle

Men's Greco-Roman

References

External links 
 International Committee of Mediterranean Games Official website
 
 
 

Nations at the 2022 Mediterranean Games
2022
Mediterranean Games